Riwayat is a 2010 Indian drama film directed by Vijay Patkar and produced by Ajay Rane and Sanjay Patole. The film stars Khalid Siddiqui, Samapika Debnath, Saurabh Dubey and Salil Ankola in pivotal roles. The film is based on the issues of female foeticide in India. The film was screened at international film festivals and won several international awards.

Cast
 Khalid Siddiqui as Raja Desai
 Samapika Debnath as Anita Desai
 Salil Ankola as Deepak Desai
 Saurabh Dubey as Seth Girdhar Desai (Raja and Deepak's father)
 Narendra Jha as Kabeer
 Aditya Lakhia as Gangaram
 Sayaji Shinde
 Bikramjeet Kanwarpal
 Achint Kaur
 Rajendra Gupta
 Gauri Kulkarni as Radha

Critical reception
The film received mixed reviews. Srijana Das Mitra from The Times of India rated the film 2 out of 5, praised the acting and criticised that the film should have "highlighted the issue only". Shaheen Parker from Mid-Day rated 1.5 out of 5 criticised the film's story and direction.

Accolades
The film was selected officially at many film festivals, including Monaco Charity International Film Festival, Cannes Film Festival, Cairo International Film Festival, Tallinn Black Nights Film Festival, CinefestOZ, and various film festivals in India. The film won five awards at different international film festivals.

References

External links
 Riwayat at Broadway Cinema portal
 
 Riwayat at the Rotten Tomatoes

2010 crime drama films
2010 films
Indian crime drama films
Films about dysfunctional families
Films about women in India
Violence against women in India
Films about domestic violence
Films about sex selection in India